The Air Force Court of Criminal Appeals (AFCCA) is an independent appellate judicial body authorized by Congress and established by the Judge Advocate General of the Air Force pursuant to the exclusive authority under (a).  The Court hears and decides appeals of United States Air Force court-martial convictions and appeals pendente lite.  Its appellate judges are assigned to the Court by The Judge Advocate General.  The Judge Advocate General instructs court-martial convening authorities to take action in accordance with the Court's decisions.

The Air Force Court of Criminal Appeals is located at Andrews Air Force Base in Prince George's County, Maryland.

Jurisdiction
The court conducts mandatory review of all courts-martial of Air Force members referred to the court (unless waived by the appellant) pursuant to Articles 62, 66, 69, and 73 of the Uniform Code of Military Justice, and, when necessary in furtherance of its jurisdiction, reviews all petitions for extraordinary relief properly filed before it.

This includes:
all trials by court-martial in which the sentence includes confinement for one year or longer, a bad-conduct or dishonorable discharge, dismissal of a commissioned officer or cadet, or death;
all cases reviewed by the Judge Advocate General of the Air Force and forwarded for review under UCMJ Article 69(d);
certain government appeals of orders or rulings of military trial judges that terminate proceedings, exclude evidence, or which concern the disclosure of classified information; and
petitions for new trial referred by The Judge Advocate General; and
petitions for extraordinary relief, including writs of mandamus, writs of prohibition, writs of habeas corpus, and writs of error coram nobis.

The next level of appeal from the AFCCA is the United States Court of Appeals for the Armed Forces.

Current Composition of the Court
The judges may be commissioned officers or civilians. As of 2019, the Court is constituted as follows:

Chief Judge Karen E. Mayberry
Senior Judge John C. Johnson
Senior Judge Julie J.R. Huygen
Judge Richard A. Mink
Judge Naomi P. Dennis
Judge Tom E. Posch
Judge Michael A. Lewis
Judge James E. Key III
Reserve Judge Joseph S. Kiefer
Reserve Judge Lucy H. Carrillo
Reserve Judge Michael D. Schag

See also
Army Court of Criminal Appeals
Navy-Marine Corps Court of Criminal Appeals
Coast Guard Court of Criminal Appeals

References

External links
Air Force Court of Criminal Appeals official homepage
History of the Air Force Court of Criminal Appeals

United States Air Force
Article I tribunals
United States military courts
Courts-martial in the United States
1968 establishments in the United States
Courts and tribunals established in 1968